The Chronicle of Pseudo-Joshua the Stylite is an anonymous Syriac history of the period 494–506 AD. Its actual title as given in the manuscript is A Historical Narrative of the Period of Distress Which Occurred in Edessa, Amid and All Mesopotamia. It is divided between two distressful events that occurred in Edessa and the surrounding region: an outbreak of plague, locusts and famine from 494 to 502 and the Roman–Persian war of 502–506. It is the earliest surviving work of Syriac historiography and provides the most detailed account of the Roman–Persian war. It was written near in time to the events it describes and is thus of the highest historical value.

Notes

Bibliography

External links
English translation by William Wright at Tertullian.org
English translation by William Wright at Archive.org

Syriac chronicles
Syriac Christianity
Anastasian War
Christianity in the Byzantine Empire
Ancient Upper Mesopotamia